Justin Herwick (born June 27, 1970) is an American former actor. He is best known for his role as Jackson in Everett Lewis's 2002 film Luster.

Herwick and actress Nicole Eggert have a daughter together, born in 1998.

Filmography
1994: Cityscrapes: Los Angeles as Ben
1997: C-16: FBI as Orange Kid (TV series) 
1997: As Good as It Gets as a street hustler
1998: Broken Vessels as Mike
2002: Luster as Jackson

References

External links

1970 births
Living people
American male film actors
People from Cerritos, California
Male actors from California
20th-century American male actors
21st-century American male actors